Hopwood Hall is the central and oldest building on the campus Lynchburg College in Lynchburg, Virginia.  It was built in 1909 to a design by Edward G. Frye, a Roanoke-based architect.  It is a four-story building with Beaux Arts styling, and is one of the most architecturally sophisticated buildings in the city.  It is named for Dr. Josephus Hopwood, one of the college's founders.  The building has had many functions over the years, but has always housed classrooms; its library was restored to its original appearance in 2016.

The building was listed on the National Register of Historic Places in 2017.

See also
National Register of Historic Places listings in Lynchburg, Virginia

References

University and college buildings on the National Register of Historic Places in Virginia
Queen Anne architecture in Virginia
School buildings completed in 1909
Buildings and structures in Lynchburg, Virginia
National Register of Historic Places in Lynchburg, Virginia
1909 establishments in Virginia